Burn Hall may refer to:

 Army Burn Hall College, a Pakistan Army-administered school and college in Abbottabad, Pakistan, formerly known as "Burn Hall School"
 Burn Hall, County Durham, a country house in County Durham, England
 Burn Hall School, a missionary school in Srinagar, Kashmir